The Women's Giant Slalom in the 2017 FIS Alpine Skiing World Cup consisted of nine events, including the World Cup finals in Aspen, Colorado (USA). Tessa Worley of France had never won a season-long championship in the World Cup but this season had reached the giant slalom podium seven times, including three wins, and held an 80-point lead over runner-up Mikaela Shiffrin of the US in the standings before the finals. In the finals, Worley finished fifth (one spot ahead of Shiffrin) and became a first-time discipline champion.

The season was interrupted by the 2017 World Ski Championships, which were held from 6–20 February in St. Moritz, Switzerland. The women's giant slalom was held on 16 February.

Standings

DNF1 = Did Not Finish run 1
DSQ1 = Disqualified run 1
DNQ = Did Not Qualify for run 2
DNF2 = Did Not Finish run 2
DSQ2 = Disqualified run 2
DNS = Did Not Start

See also
 2017 Alpine Skiing World Cup – Women's summary rankings
 2017 Alpine Skiing World Cup – Women's Overall
 2017 Alpine Skiing World Cup – Women's Downhill
 2017 Alpine Skiing World Cup – Women's Super-G
 2017 Alpine Skiing World Cup – Women's Slalom
 2017 Alpine Skiing World Cup – Women's Combined

References

External links
 Alpine Skiing at FIS website

Women's Giant Slalom
FIS Alpine Ski World Cup women's giant slalom discipline titles